Erik Marxen (born 2 December 1990) is a Danish professional footballer who plays as a centre-back for Danish Superliga club Nordsjælland.

Career

Vejle
Marxen was born in Middelfart. He began his career in the youth academy of the local club Middelfart G&BK where he played alongside the likes of Christian Eriksen and Rasmus Falk. He eventually joined Vejle Boldklub, and made his professional debut on 13 April 2009 in a 4–1 loss in the Danish Superliga to FC Copenhagen. He came on as a late substitute for Marc Pedersen. On 10 June 2009, he signed a contract until 2011 which promoted him to the first team.

Horsens
An integral part of the Vejle side in the second-tier 1st Division, in January 2013 he signed a contract with AC Horsens that would see him move in the summer transfer window.

Randers
On 9 March 2015, it was announced that Marxen would join Randers FC on a three-year deal starting from 1 July 2015. He made his debut on 2 July 2015 in a 1–0 away win over Andorran club UE Sant Julià in the UEFA Europa League, coming on as a substitute for goalscorer Jonas Borring in the 82nd minute. He made his domestic league debut for the club on 9 August in a 3–3 home draw against Brøndby. Marxen scored his first goal for the club on 23 November in a 3–2 defeat away against AaB. The goal was a special one, as Marxen scored directly from a corner kick, swerving over AaB-goalkeeper Nicolai Larsen.

On 23 June 2018, Marxen extended his contract with Randers until December 2020.

Marxen was appointed the new team captain of Randers on 30 January 2019, taking over the role from Nicolai Poulsen who would leave the club as a free agent for rivals AGF. The following season, he won his first trophy as Randers clinched the Danish Cup victory in a 4–0 beatdown of SønderjyskE in the final, with Marxen scoring the opening goal in the second minute.

Nordsjælland
On 22 December 2021 FC Nordsjælland confirmed, that Marxen had signed four-year contract with the club, starting in January 2022. He made his competitive debut on 20 February in a 2–0 league loss to Brøndby, starting at centre-back.

Honours
Randers
Danish Cup: 2020–21

References

External links
 
 Erik Marxen at Randers FC

1990 births
Living people
People from Middelfart Municipality
Association football defenders
Danish men's footballers
Middelfart Boldklub players
Vejle Boldklub players
AC Horsens players
SønderjyskE Fodbold players
Randers FC players
FC Nordsjælland players
Danish Superliga players
Danish 1st Division players
Sportspeople from the Region of Southern Denmark